Pedro Ferreira (born 28 November 1977) is a Portuguese swimmer. He competed in the men's 1500 metre freestyle event at the 1996 Summer Olympics.

References

1977 births
Living people
Portuguese male freestyle swimmers
Olympic swimmers of Portugal
Swimmers at the 1996 Summer Olympics
Place of birth missing (living people)